The 2012 United States House of Representatives election in the United States Virgin Islands was held on Tuesday, November 6, 2012 and elected the non-voting Delegate to the United States House of Representatives from the United States Virgin Islands.  The election coincided with the elections of other federal offices, including a quadrennial presidential election.

The non-voting delegate is elected for two-year terms.  Democratic incumbent Donna Christian-Christensen, who had represented the district since 1997, won  re-election.

Primary elections were held on September 8, 2012.

Democratic primary

Candidates
 Donna Christian-Christensen, incumbent Delegate
 Stacey Plaskett, attorney and former Congressional staffer

Republican primary

Candidates
 Vince Danet, Republican nominee for Delegate in 2010
 Holland Redfield, radio talk show host and former Virgin Islands Senator

General election

Candidates
 Guillaume Mimoun (I), perennial candidate
 Warren Mosler (I), perennial candidate
 Norma Pickard Samuel (I)

General election results

See also
 United States House of Representatives election in the United States Virgin Islands, 2010

References

External links
 Donna Christensen campaign website
 Holland Redfield campaign website

United States Virgin Islands

2012
2012 United States Virgin Islands elections